The Regional Transportation Commission of Washoe County (RTC) is the public body responsible for the transportation needs throughout Reno, Sparks and Washoe County, Nevada. The RTC, founded by the Nevada Legislature in 1979, is an amalgamation of the Regional Street and Highway Commission, the Regional Transit Commission and the Washoe County Area Transportation Study Policy Committee. They provide public transportation services, street and highway construction, and transportation planning.

Public transportation

RTC Ride 
RTC RIDE is the public transit bus system.

History

Citifare era (1978–2004) 
During the early part of the 20th century, streetcars provided public transportation between Reno and Sparks and served Downtown Reno, the University of Nevada, and the early suburbs of Reno. By the late 1920s, the streetcars became unprofitable and the tracks were removed. The Regional Transportation Commission of Washoe County (RTC) created the Citifare bus system after several decades of substandard private bus transit. Citifare service began on September 17, 1978 with five used buses serving four routes. Throughout the next twenty five years, the system grew to a fleet of 75 buses operating 30 routes. These years also saw the construction of two transit centers—CitiCenter in Downtown Reno in 1984 and CitiStation near Victorian Square in Downtown Sparks. By 2003, the growing success of the system, coupled with planning efforts to incorporate bus rapid transit and transit oriented development into the community, lead the RTC to implement a rebranding of the entire organization, as well as Citifare, over the upcoming years.

RTC RIDE (2004–present) 
With the rebranding of the entire organization, planning, streets and highways construction, and public transportation were streamlined to provide a better identity for the organization and to improve service to the community. Original Nova coaches were gradually replaced with low floor Gillig coaches. New logos and bus livery was implemented. New shelters and bus stop signage were also introduced. The RTC also began working on new capital projects to replace the aging CitiCenter and CitiStation transit terminals. In October 2008, RTC opened RTC Centennial Plaza in Sparks and the RTC Citicenter in downtown Reno was replaced by the new RTC 4th Street Station on October 31, 2010.

Fares 
Children 5 years old or younger 6 ride free when accompanied by a fare-paying rider. Fares may be purchased on board in cash or purchased with an online or fax order form. Beginning in December 2016 passes are also available for purchase on the Token Transit mobile ticketing app.

Routes

Current routes 
RTC RIDE operates on a hub and spoke system, with routes that radiate out from the transit centers and then returning in. It also operates on a pulse system that allows for timed transfers at the transit centers every fifteen minutes.
Routes 1-19 generally operate in the Reno area and originate from RTC 4TH STREET STATION.
Routes 20-29 generally operate in the Sparks area and originate from RTC CENTENNIAL PLAZA.
Routes 50-59 generally operate in South Reno and originate from RTC MEADOWOOD MALL TRANSFER FACILITY.

1- South Virginia
2- 9th Street/Silverada/Sparks
2s- West Sparks
3- Kings Row/Mae Anne/Sky Mountain
4- West 7th
5- Sutro/Sun Valley
6- Arlington/Moana
7- Stead
9- Prater Way/El Rancho/South Kietzke
11- 4th Street/Prater Way
12- Terminal/Neil
13- Kirman/Locust/Park Lane
14- East Mill
15- Sutro/Wedekind/TMCC
16- Idlewild
18- Glendale/Greg
19- Wells/Plumb/Airport
21- Sparks Marina
26- East Prater
54- Mira Loma/Rock
56- South Meadows/Damonte Ranch

Former routes 
These are routes that formerly operated within the past 20 years:
1- South Virginia (Replaced by RTC RAPID and RAPID CONNECT)
8- Washington/Evans loop
10- South Virginia
10- Parr Blvd/TMCC (second iteration)
11X- Reno-Sparks Express
12- West Sparks (replaced by Route 2s)
14A- Mill/Airport
17 – Lemmon Valley (replaced by FlexRide North Valleys, parts integrated into the Route 7)
18X- Glendale-Greg Express (replaced by Route 28/discontinued in September 2017)
19- Greg/Vista (second iteration)
22- Northeast Sparks
24- Vassar/Airport
25- East Prater/Baring (replaced by FlexRide Sparks/Spanish Springs)
28- Glendale/Spice Island
37- Moya/Lear (largely incorporated into route 7)
55- Ridgeview
 57- Damonte Ranch (incorporated into route 56)
 RTC CONNECT (Route was renamed back to route 1 on 8/11/13)

Fleet

Current 
 2004 Gillig Phantom (Bus Numbers 492-494) Used for Training mostly
 2006–2008 Gillig BRT Diesel (Bus Numbers 509-530)
 2010 New Flyer DE60LFA (Bus Numbers 606-613)
 2013 Proterra Ecoliner 35-Foot (Bus Numbers 306-309)
 2013 Gillig BRTPlus Hybrid (Bus Numbers 531-538)
 2017–2018 Proterra Catalyst E2 40-Foot (Bus Numbers 310-324)
 2018 Proterra Catalyst E2 40 Foot (Bus Numbers 539-542) Used on RTC REGIONAL CONNECTOR
 2020–2021 New Flyer XDE40 Hybrid (Bus Numbers 543-561)
 2020–2021 Proterra ZX5 40-Foot (Bus Numbers 325 and 326)

Past 
 1980–1988 GMC RTS-04
 1991 TMC RTS-06
 1998–2000 NovaBus RTS-06
 2002 Neoplan USA AN460LF (Bus # 605)
 2003 Optima Opus
 2003–2004 Gillig Low Floor (Bus Numbers 478-491)
 2007 Gillig BRT Hybrid (Bus Numbers 503 and 504)
 2007–2008 Gillig BRT (Bus Numbers 495-502 and 505-508)

RTC Rapid 
RTC RAPID is RTC's bus rapid transit system. RAPID consists of two routes with limited stops and higher frequencies.

Virginia Line 

The RTC RAPID Virginia LINE operates along Virginia Street between Downtown Reno and Meadowood Mall. On March 8, 2020 the RTC extended the Virginia Line to the University of Nevada, Reno.

Lincoln Line 

The RTC RAPID LINCOLN LINE operates along 4th Street and Prater Way between Downtown Reno and Victorian Square (RTC Centennial Plaza). RTC held a grand opening for the Lincoln line on 14 December 2018.

RTC Regional Connector 
RTC REGIONAL CONNECTOR provides express bus service between Reno, Meadowood Mall, and Carson City.

RTC Sierra Spirit 
RTC SIERRA SPIRIT was a popular circulator service operating every 20 minutes along Virginia Street in Downtown Reno between the University of Nevada, Reno and the Truckee River. This was replaced with the Temporary Route, "UNR-Midtown Direct" on 25 August 2019.

UNR-Midtown Direct 
UNR-Midtown Direct is a temporary route introduced on 25 August 2019 to replace RTC Sierra Spirit and will be replaced with the RTC RAPID Virginia Line Service once the RTC RAPID Expansion is complete to UNR, basically replacing the route. This route operates every 30 minutes from Midtown Reno to the University of Nevada Reno along Virginia (Northbound) and Sierra (Southbound) Streets. This route was discontinued following the extension to UNR.

RTC Access 
RTC ACCESS is the system's paratransit service

RTC FlexRide 
RTC FlexRide is the system's microtransit service serving Sparks/Spanish Springs, North Valleys and NW Reno/Sommersett.

RTC Smart Trips 
In addition to public transportation, RTC RIDE, through their program RTC SMART TRIPS, provides services to assist those wishing to carpool for their commute.

RTC Vanpool 
RTC VANPOOL is a membership-based service which allows commuters to rent a van for their commute.  The van is driven by one of the members, who picks up and drops off other riders at an agreed-upon location.  Expenses are shared by all riders, and subsidized by RTC.

RTC Trip Match 
RTC TRIP MATCH is a free ride-matching program for the Truckee Meadows offered by RTC SMART TRIPS in partnership with Greenride.

Streets & Highways 
RTC's Streets and Highways program is a joint effort involving the City of Reno, the City of Sparks, the Washoe County, and RTC.  Their primary responsibility is road repair and construction within their jurisdiction, specifically, regional roadways, high-traffic (greater than 5,000 avg. daily trips) streets, and roads that cross geographic barriers or that connect jurisdictions.  Low-traffic and neighborhood streets are left to local jurisdictions.

Planning 
Perhaps RTC's most important duty is in the area of planning for the regions transportation needs.  Planning is divided into long range and short range needs.

Long-range planning 
The Regional Transportation Plan (RTP) is RTC's plan to create and maintain the long-term transportation requirements for the Truckee Meadows.  It addresses travel by all modes including automobiles, transit, bicycles, pedestrians, aviation, rail and goods movement as well as transportation management strategies to make the system more efficient.

Short-range planning 
The Regional Transportation Improvement Program (RTIP) is RTC's short-range plan to meet the current needs of the Truckee Meadows.  Spanning 5 years (FY 2018–2022), the current plan was published on 1 October 2017.

See also 
 Regional Transportation Commission of Southern Nevada

References

External links 
 
 RTC Smart Tips website

1979 establishments in Nevada
Bus rapid transit in Nevada
Bus transportation in Nevada
Government agencies established in 1979
Local government in Nevada
Public transportation in Nevada
Reno, NV Metropolitan Statistical Area
Sparks, Nevada
Transportation in Reno, Nevada
Transportation in Washoe County, Nevada